The term Irish New Zealander (Irish: Gael-Nua-Shéalaigh) refers to New Zealanders of full or partial Irish ancestry. This includes Irish immigrants as well as New Zealanders of Irish descent. The term makes no distinction concerning religion and encompasses both Catholic and Protestant (including Anglo-Irish) immigrants and their descendants; nonetheless, the chief criterion of distinction between Irish immigrants, especially those who arrived in the nineteenth century, is religion. 

Irish people have played a significant role in the history of New Zealand. The Irish diaspora in the nineteenth century reached New Zealand, with many Irish people immigrating to the country, predominantly to Auckland, Canterbury and the West Coast. With Irish immigration to New Zealand, the Irish people established Catholic churches and schools, especially in Auckland. Today, there are roughly 800,000 New Zealanders of Irish ancestry (approximately 15% of the total population). This is an estimated figure based on historical immigration patterns, with a much smaller proportion of the population self-identifying as Irish. Irish culture has influenced the wider culture of New Zealand.

The descendants of the Irish people and their culture have mixed with other New Zealand European cultures to form modern-day New Zealand culture. However, unlike many Scottish settlers in Otago and Southland Irish settlers were more spread out across the country, resulting in visible Irish communities throughout New Zealand that began to mix with other communities. Job opportunities for Irish-born New Zealanders were limited as a result of anti-Irish bias. In the 1930s 40% of the New Zealand Police Force were of Irish ancestry. One of the main reasons the Irish immigrated to New Zealand was because of the Great Famine and fear of yet another famine.

Irish culture in New Zealand 
The Irish national public holiday, St. Patrick's Day is widely celebrated in New Zealand with over 65 pubs around the country participating.

Irish immigration to New Zealand; 1840–1915
Some of the first Irish came with the royal New Zealand fencibles veterans of the British army given land for service. Around half of the whom were Irish Catholics. Until 1852 the Irish comprised just under 15% of New Zealand immigrants. A Dublin University Magazine described New Zealand as ‘the most recent, remotest, and least civilised of our colonies’; the voyage cost over four times that of crossing the Atlantic to America.  Immigration from the region of Leinster was common from 1840 towards 1852. The majority of Irish immigrants to New Zealand during the Irish diaspora that followed the Irish Famine of 1845-1852 were indigenous Irish from Munster and indirect emigrants from Australia during the gold rushes. In the early twentieth century immigration from the region of Ulster increased. This "reflected the preference for Protestants among New Zealand immigration authorities". In order to make New Zealand more attractive as a place of settlement for migrants, "fudging" of statistics occurred emphasising homogeneity (using the phrase ‘98.5 percent British’). Place of birth was used to circumvent ethnicity, "in order to conceal the numbers of other population groups, particularly the Irish and Chinese"

Politics 
Significant expressions of Irish culture came in public debate. The long struggles in Ireland for land reform, home rule rather than English rule, and eventually independence were a major concern of British politics throughout the 19th and early 20th centuries. Many in New Zealand followed these debates and crises, and expressed their sympathies publicly. Occasionally it came in the form of civil disorder. There were 'shindies' between Irish Nationalists and Irish Unionist Orangemen at Ōkārito in 1865. In Christchurch on Boxing Day 1879, 30 Irishmen attacked an Orange procession with pick-handles, and in Timaru 150 men from Thomas O’Driscoll's Hibernian Hotel surrounded Irish Orangemen and prevented their procession. In 2013 the NZ Press Council (now the NZ Media Council) upheld a number of complaints that denigrated Irish identity in New Zealand.

Irish place names in New Zealand 
There are some place names in New Zealand with connections to Ireland or Irish people, including:

Ardmore, after Ardmore, County Waterford
Athenree, after Athenree, County Tyrone
Ballance, after Irish-born Prime Minister John Ballance
Bangor, after Bangor, County Down
Belfast, after Belfast
Bowentown, after Irish-born Governor Sir George Bowen, who was from Ulster
Camla, after Camla, County Monaghan
Capleston, after Irish settler Patrick Quirk Caples
Cronadun, after Cronadun, County Donegal
Dargaville, after Irish settler Joseph Dargaville
Dromore
Dunsandel, after Dunsandle Castle, Galway
Glasnevin, New Zealand, after Glasnevin, Dublin
Glenavy, New Zealand, after Glenavy, County Antrim
Glen Massey, after Irish-born Prime Minister William Massey
Hobsonville, after Irish-born Governor William Hobson
Hurleyville, after a family of Irish settlers
Katikati, previously known as Waterford
Kerrytown, after County Kerry
Killinchy, after Killinchy, County Down
Kingston, originally St Johns, after Irish-born police commissioner St John Branigan
Martinborough, after Irish settler  John Martin
Mauriceville, after Irish-born Minister of Immigration and Crown Lands  Sir George Maurice O'Rorke
Massey, after Irish-born Prime Minister William Massey
Shannon, after Irish settler George Vance Shannon
Queenstown, after Cobh
Westport, after Westport, County Mayo

See also

 European New Zealanders
 Europeans in Oceania
 Ireland–New Zealand relations
 Pākehā
 immigration to New Zealand

References

 
 
European New Zealander